Indonesia and Iran established diplomatic relations in 1950. Indonesia has an embassy in Tehran, and Iran has an embassy in Jakarta. Both countries are full members of the World Trade Organization (WTO), The Non-Aligned Movement, Organisation of Islamic Cooperation (OIC), and Developing 8 Countries.

Relations between Indonesia and Iran are particularly important because both nations, as Muslim majority countries, are responsible for representing the Islamic world globally. Indonesia has the largest Sunni population in the world, while Iran is one of the few Shiite majority nations in the world. Relations between the two countries can also represent the harmonization and reconciliation between Sunnis and Shiites.

History

Persian traders have been active in Indonesia since the Srivijaya period in 8th centuries. It can be assumed that the contact between traders, mostly from Persia and the people of the Indonesia archipelago since the 7th century, resulted in a process of mutual influence in terms of the economic, social, cultural, religious, and especially language aspects between two society.

There is also an inscription of Persian poetry on the tomb of Fatimah bint Maimun in the village of Leran which dates from the 11th century during the era of Sultan Malik Saleh, the first Muslim ruler of Sumatra.

In the 13th century many clerics from Persia who visited the kingdoms in the Indonesian archipelago brought Persian Islamic traditions and culture to Indonesia. One example is the art of calligraphy carved on Islamic tombstones in the Indonesia archipelago. There is also the Tabut (Tabot) culture in Bengkulu and Tabuik in West Sumatra which is similar to the ritual in Persia every 10th of Muharram.

During the 16th and 17th centuries, Persians operated in the Aceh Sultanate. The Spanish exploler Melchor Davalos reported on the presence of Persians in Borneo and elsewhere in the late 1500s.

Cetbang cannons were improved and used in the Demak Sultanate period during the Demak invasion of Portuguese Malacca (1513). During this period, the iron, for manufacturing Javanese cannons was imported from Khorasan in northern Persia. The material was known by Javanese as wesi kurasani (Khorasan iron).

Economic relations

In 2015, the trade value between Iran and Indonesia was only USD 300 million, down from the trade value in 2011 which was USD 1.8 billion. Therefore, the two heads of state agreed to take steps to increase trade figures.

The governments of the two countries also see promising potential in cooperation in the energy sector.  In 2016, Pertamina and the National Iranian Oil Company (NIOC) have cooperated in supplying LPG amounting to 88,000 tons and the amount will continue to increase next years. This cooperation can be expanded to other sectors such as crude oil, refineries, petrochemical products and others in the future.

Political relation

According to a 2013 BBC World Service Poll, Indonesians' perception of Iran is overwhelmingly positive, with 98% of Indonesians expressing a positive view. It is among the most favourable perception of Iran in Asia, and second-most favourable in the world.

During the 2019-2021 Persian Gulf crisis, Indonesia had seized Iranian and Panamanian tanker in Borneo. The two ships had suspected of illegally transferring oil in the waters.

Science and Technology cooperation

According to the official report of the Ministry of Research and Technology of the Republic of Indonesia, in the field of science and technology cooperation, Indonesia and Iran have signed an MoU in 2006 and formed a Joint Science and Technology Committee since 2008. In October 2017 the two met and produced several activity plans, namely:

Formation of the Indonesian Iranian University Network for the Implementation of a Symposium with Indonesia and Iran, back to back

The 6th meeting of the Committee on Indonesian Iran Science and Technology Working Group in Indonesia semester 1 of 2019.

The implementation of the Mobility Program includes the participation of Indonesian researchers and stakeholders in the International Seminar forum.

Regarding Indonesian promotional activities, the Indonesian Embassy actively participates in various exhibitions that showcase economic potential while synergistically introducing Indonesian culture.

Cultural relation
In a cultural meeting called "Traces of the Persians in Southeast Asia" held at the Faculty of Languages ​​and Cultures, University of Indonesia (UI), topics such as similarities in Iranian and Indonesian languages ​​and cultures were explored. Attended by Iran's cultural attaché in Indonesia, Hojatollah Ebrahimian, and Dean of the Faculty of Languages ​​and Cultural Sciences Adrianus Lavranous, the meeting also aimed to increase cultural ties and understanding between the two Muslim countries.

Linguistic

Iran and Indonesia share a linguistic heritage, in fact the language spoken in Indonesia language has 350 Persian words as part of its lexicon. For example, the word Anggur in Indonesian comes from the Persian word انگور‎ (angur) which means grapes. The word Kismis in Indonesian comes from the Persian word کشمش‎ (kešmeš) which means raisins. The word Syahbandar in Indonesian means port ruler. Consisting of the word Bandar in Indonesian comes from the Persian word بندر‎ (bandar) with the same meaning. And the word shah comes from the word شاه‎ (šâh) which means King.

References

 
Iran
Bilateral relations of Iran